The Mexican parrotlet (Forpus cyanopygius), also known as the turquoise-rumped parrotlet or the Mexican blue-rumped parrotlet, is a species of parrot in the family Psittacidae.

There are two subspecies: Grayson's parrotlet or the Tres Marias parrotlet (F. c. insularis) and F. c. cyanopygius.

Description

Distribution and habitat
Mexican parrotlets are endemic to western Mexico. Their range extends from southern Sonora to Colima. This species is the northernmost member of the genus Forpus. Though they are non-migratory, they wander throughout their range to follow the blooming and growth patterns of the plants they prefer to feed on.

Natural habitats are subtropical or tropical dry scrublands, deciduous forests, open grasslands with scattered trees, heavily degraded former forest, plantations, and woodlands along watercourses.

Conservation 
According to the IUCN Red List, Mexican parrotlets are Near Threatened. The population is estimated to be 50,000 or greater, but it is decreasing due to a combination of the illegal hunting and trapping of wild individuals and habitat loss. Based on records created before 1995, there were approximately 208,000 individuals in Mexico. According to records from 1996–2013, around 107,000 remain, which represents a 48.4% drop in population.

Threats 
It is estimated that up to 8,000 individuals are illegally captured for the pet trade every year. There are no current conservation measures in place, but many areas across the Mexican parrotlet's range are already protected.

Behavior

Social 
Mexican parrotlets are highly social and gregarious birds, most often found in flocks of 4-30 individuals made up of pairs and family groups. When flying in these flocks, they fly quickly and in relatively tight formations. They create a variety of squeaky, excited-sounding chirps while perched or in flight. While feeding, they make occasional squawks.

Reproduction 
Mexican parrotlets typically breed between May and July, and lay clutches of up to 3 small, white eggs. They are typically incubated for at least 19 days, and chicks fledge 4–5 weeks after hatching. Mexican parrotlets can live to be over 20 years old. Mexican parrotlets usually nest in tree cavities, cacti, and other similar structures.

Diet 
Mexican parrotlets most commonly eat seeds, grass seeds, berries, and Ficus (fig) fruits, which may be ripe or half-ripe. They forage both on the ground and in trees and shrubs as large flocks. They are known to wander frequently in search of food, making regional population estimates difficult.

Aviculture 
Mexican parrotlets are uncommon, though not unheard of, in aviculture. Because of their protections, they cannot legally be captured from the wild and sold as pets, so the captive population relies on breeding programs.

References

External links
World Parrot Trust Parrot Encyclopedia: species profile
Neotropical Birds by Cornell Lab of Ornithology: species profile
eBird by Cornell Lab of Ornithology: species profile

Forpus
Endemic birds of Mexico
Parrotlet, Mexican
Near threatened fauna of North America
Birds described in 1856
Taxa named by Charles de Souancé
Taxonomy articles created by Polbot
Birds of the Sierra Madre Occidental
Jalisco dry forests